Storfors Church is a church building in Storfors, which is located in the Diocese of Karlstad of the Church of Sweden. Storfors is situated between Kristinehamn and Filipstad. The church was built in 1959 from drawing plans by architect Tor Engloo. On 10 May 1959, the church was inaugurated by bishop Gert Borgenstierna. 

The building has a concrete base and outer walls in glavashiffer. The roof is made of copper plates. The church room is orientated in an east-west direction, with the cross located to the east. The inner-walls are twelve meters high. A seven sided baptismal font of limestone from Gotland was made by the stone shopper R Eklund in Bisby, and was placed in the church in 1964. In the cross hangs an apostle crown designed by Knut Hallberg; the apostle crown is a light crown made of brass with twelve stearing lights. The pulpit is made of light wood.

Gallery

References

Other websites
 

Churches in Värmland County
Churches completed in 1959
Churches in the Diocese of Karlstad
1959 establishments in Sweden
Buildings and structures in Storfors Municipality